The Terminal 1-IGI Airport Metro Station is located on the Magenta Line of the Delhi Metro. It was part of Phase III of Delhi Metro. It was opened to public on 29 May 2018.

History

The station

Station layout

Entry/exit

Connections

Links to Indira Gandhi International Airport Terminal 1-D.

See also

IGI Airport metro station
List of Delhi Metro stations
Transport in Delhi
Delhi Metro Rail Corporation
Delhi Suburban Railway
Delhi Monorail
Indira Gandhi International Airport
Delhi Transport Corporation
South West Delhi
National Capital Region (India)
List of rapid transit systems
List of metro systems

References

External links

 Delhi Metro Rail Corporation Ltd. (Official site)
 Delhi Metro Annual Reports
 

Delhi Metro stations
Railway stations in West Delhi district